Masoud Sakhvatdoust (مسعود سخاوت دوست) (born September 21, 1984) is an Iranian writer, composer and musician. He is the composer of more than 50 international films.

He won the Best Composer award at the Fajr Film Festival for Breath and “The Situation of Mehdi” and  “Fragrant”, “Number 10”.   He won the Golden Butterfly and Diploma of Honor for Best Music for Lipar.

Biography 
Masoud Sekhavatdoust was born in 1984 in Qazvin. He started learning the Santoor at the age of 10 and continued with his master Parviz Meshkatian up to the advanced level. At the age of 15, he started taking harmony and composition lessons from Alireza Mashayekhi. He has taken part in a few master classes of Estonian composer Arvo Pärt and Professor Roger Wallis from the Royal Institute of Technology in Stockholm and he has also taken an advanced stage course in Iran with Professor Kiawash Sahebnasagh. He has taken a few Conducting lessons with Taghi Zarabi.

He is a nominee for the award Crystal Simorgh Best Music Shena-ye Parvaneh (2020), Crystal Simorgh Best Music Shabi Ke Mah Kamel Shod (2019), Golden Butterfly The Best Artistic & Technical Achievement

Wolf Cubs of Apple Valley (2020), Crystal Simorgh Best Music Nafas (2016),Jury Prize Tallinn Black Nights Film Festival for Best Music Shabi Ke Mah Kamel Shod (2019)

He also achieved Golden Butterfly and Diploma of Honor for Best Music for ‘Lipar’ .

He won the Best Composer award "Cristal  Simorgh" at the Fajr Film Festival for  “The Situation of Mehdi” “Fragrant”, “Number 10”. 

 Discography 
 New Dementia(2016), Javan  Records
 Sign (Original Motion Picture Soundtrack)'' (2020), Javan Records

Filmography

References

External links

1984 births
Living people
Decca Records artists
Disney people
Iranian film score composers
Male classical composers
Iranian record producers
Television composers
Iranian classical musicians
Male film score composers
Male television composers
Musicians from Tehran